Horace G. Campbell is an international peace and justice scholar and Professor of African American Studies and Political Science at Syracuse University in Syracuse, New York. Born in Montego Bay, Jamaica, he has been involved in Africa's Liberation Struggles and in the struggles for peace and justice globally for more than four decades. From his years in Toronto, Canada, to his sojourns in Uganda, Tanzania, Zimbabwe, the United Kingdom and parts of the Caribbean, he has been an influential force offering alternatives to the hegemonic ideas of Eurocentrism. In an attempt to theorise new concepts of revolution in the 21st century he has been seeking to expand on the ideas of fractals and the importance of emancipatory ideas. He currently teaches in the Department of African American Studies at Syracuse University.

Education and early academics 
Campbell was educated in the Caribbean, Canada, Uganda and the United Kingdom. He did his doctoral work at Sussex University in the United Kingdom. The title of his thesis was "The Commandist State in Uganda". Since 1979, he has been studying issues of militarism and transformation in Africa. Before teaching at Syracuse University, Horace Campbell taught in the Department of Political Science at Northwestern University in Evanston, Illinois and for six years at the University of Dar es Salaam, Tanzania. Campbell seeks to continue the traditions of scholarship and activism of the Dar es Salaam School of History and Philosophy. He has been a Visiting Distinguished Professor in China (at Tsinghua University), South Africa, Ireland and Uganda. In the Fall of 2011 and 2013 he taught as a Visiting Distinguished Professor in the Department of International Relations at Tsinghua University in Beijing. At Tsinghua University he taught courses on Comparative Politics and International Political Economy.

Contributions to scholarship 
Presently, within Syracuse University, Campbell serves as a mentor for younger scholars and teaches courses on Politics in Africa, African International Relations, Militarism and Transformation in Southern Africa, Introduction to Pan Africanism and The Caribbean Society since Independence, Caribbean Intellectual Thought and Introduction to African American Studies. At Syracuse University, Campbell is a member of the International Relations Faculty in the Maxwell School. He is also one of the principal conveners for the Graduate Seminar on Pan Africanism: Research and Readings. In this course he conducts a major seminar on the issues of peace and reconstruction and the meanings of Pan Africanism today.

He is the Director of the Africa Initiative (AI) at Syracuse University. The purpose of the initiative is to focus on Africa as an important source of knowledge, highlighting work on the continent by Syracuse University scholars. The scholars represent a variety of disciplines including the arts, humanities, social sciences, sciences, mathematics, engineering and others. The Africa Initiative has the following areas of research and advocacy: peace and reconstruction, Africa and the information revolution, gender and the environment in the Pan African world, African Orature, African Languages and literature, and Reparations in the Twenty First Century.

Campbell has published widely. His most recent book, Global NATO and the Catastrophic Failure in Libya: Lessons for Africa in the Forging of African Unity, exposed the duplicity and hypocrisy of the counter revolution in Libya that is now acting as a force for the destabilisation of North Africa. His most important book, Rasta and Resistance: From Marcus Garvey to Walter Rodney, is going through its seventh edition. In 2014 the French edition of this book was published by Camion Blanc. Campbell's book on Zimbabwe sought to cut through the anti-imperialist discourse of the political leadership in Zimbabwe. His Reclaiming Zimbabwe: The Exhaustion of the Patriarchal Model of Liberation (David Phillip, South Africa and Africa World Press, New Jersey, 2003) lays out a new critique of liberation movements that go sour and fail to transform themselves and their societies. His book Pan Africanism, Pan Africanists and African Liberation in the 21st Century (New Academia Publishers 2006), co-edited with Rodney Worrell, laid out some of the conceptual challenges for the unification of Africa and the emancipation of African peoples globally.

Campbell's Barack Obama and Twenty-first Century Politics: A Revolutionary Moment in the USA<ref>Barack Obama and Twenty-first Century Politics: A Revolutionary Moment in the USA, 2010.</ref> analysed the new social forces that organised to intervene in the political process of the United States in the midst of the global financial crisis. This book outlined just how significant the movement behind Barack Obama was for the politics of the United States and for the world. In breaking from the conceptual gridlock of traditional political science in the United States, this book examined the networks that made the electoral victory possible in 2007–2008 and discusses the importance of self-organization and self-emancipation in politics. Situated in the context of the agency of new social forces galvanised in the 2008 electoral season, the book develops a theory of politics that starts with the humanist principles of Ubuntu, healing, and reparations for the 21st century. It argues that key ideas like quantum politics and a “network of networks” move away from old forms of vanguardism during a period in history that can be characterised as a revolutionary moment. Since the writing of the book the revolutionary upsurges in Egypt has confirmed the importance of the concept of networks. Campbell’s contributions to the new stage of global revolution were published in the book African Awakening: The Emerging Revolutions, edited by Sokari Ekine and Firoze Manji.

Campbell has contributed more than 40 chapters to other edited books and has published numerous articles and reviews in scholarly journals. He writes regularly for the major newspapers in the US, Southern Africa, East Africa, the Caribbean, and the United Kingdom. He has been a commentator on international politics on MSNBC, Democracy Now!, CCTV (in China), Pacifica Radio and other radio stations in the USA, the Caribbean, East Africa, and South Africa. His commentaries on international issues are widely circulated via Pambazuka News and Counterpunch. Campbell's interview for the Blackelectorate.com, on the implications of 11/2 September, 001 for humanity was widely reproduced on web sites in Africa, Europe, Latin America, and North America. As a commentator on peace and transformation, he is actively involved in the opposition to the establishment of the US Africa Command and the militarisation of African politics.

 Affiliations and activism 
Horace Campbell is active in the Syracuse community as a member of the advisory board of the Syracuse Peace Council, the oldest peace and justice organisation in the United States. He was a sponsor of the Committee for Academic Freedom in Africa throughout the nineties. He is also a board member of The Association of Concerned African Scholars (ACAS), and member of the African Studies Association and the National Conference of Black Political Scientists. He was an active member of the African Association of Political Science and was the guest editor of the first issue of the African Journal of Political Science, where he coordinated the publication on the question of Pan-Africanism in the 21st century.

In the Global Pan-African movement he worked closely with the late Tajudeen Abdul Raheem to articulate a more inclusive and internationalist concept of Pan African emancipation in the 21st Century. 
In 2005, he served as the Chairperson of the Walter Rodney Commemoration Committee. This was a committee of activists who seek to extend the work and ideas of Walter Rodney in relation to emancipatory politics.

Campbell was the first Director of the Syracuse University Abroad Program in Harare, Zimbabwe. During this period in Zimbabwe he worked with the Youth to grasp the importance of emancipation in the post-independence era. It was his interaction with the youth, especially the radical African feminists that influenced his book Reclaiming Zimbabwe: The Exhaustion of the Patriarchal Model of Liberation. In the region of Southern Africa, he participated in the debates on African Unity and continues to be an active researcher on questions of peace and reconstruction in Africa. In 2007 he was the keynote speaker at the Africa beyond Borders conference in Durban, South Africa. He delivered the Wolpe Lecture at the University of KwaZulu-Natal in July 2007.[1]  Since that time he has retained his engagement with the politics of transformation and emancipation in Africa, actively campaigning against the politics of impunity on the continent. In 2011 he delivered the Strini Moodley Memorial Lecture in Durban, South Africa. At the Kwame Nkrumah Centenary Celebration in Accra, Ghana, in 2011 Campbell delivered a lecture entitled "Towards an Africa without Borders in the 21st Century: The Inspiration of Kwame Nkrumah”.

In the summer of 2001, he conducted research on peace in Central Africa and was based at the Global Pan African Movement in Kampala, Uganda. He gave presentations on Peace and Reconstruction before the Uganda Society in Uganda, the Nairobi Peace Initiative (Nairobi, Kenya) and the Desmond Tutu Peace Center (Cape Town, South Africa). Campbell was a presenter on Globalisation at the NGO Forum of the World Conference Against Racism (WCAR) in Durban South Africa. He served for five years as the Chairperson of the International Caucus of the Black Radical Congress.

In the summer of 2001, he worked closely with the late Tajudeen Abdul Raheem to conduct research on peace in Central Africa.  For this work he was based at the Global Pan African Movement in Kampala, Uganda. He gave presentations on Peace and Reconstruction before the Uganda Society in Uganda, the Nairobi Peace Initiative (Nairobi, Kenya) and the Desmond Tutu Peace Center (Cape Town, South Africa). Campbell was a presenter on Globalization at the NGO Forum of the World Conference Against Racism (WCAR) in Durban, South Africa.

He served for five years as the Chairperson of the International Caucus of the Black Radical Congress. He has continued to maintain his linkages with the progressive sections of the international Rastafari movement, and in 2013 he presented a major paper on the "Coral Gardens Uprising in Jamaica" at the Rastafari Conference in Kingston, Jamaica.

 Personal life 
Campbell is married to Professor Makini Zaline Roy, who is an educator, Professor of Education at Syracuse University and a community activist.

Publications

Books
Campbell, H. (2013), Global NATO and the Catastrophic Failure in Libya: Lessons for Africa in the Forging of African Unity, Monthly Review Press.
Campbell, H. (2010), Barack Obama and 21st Century Politics , Pluto Press.
Campbell, H. (2007), "China in Africa: challenging US global hegemony" in Manji, F., and S. Marks (eds), African Perspectives on China in Africa, Oxford: Pambazuka Press.
Campbell, H. (2006), Pan Africanists and African Liberation in the 21st Century, New Academia Publishers.
Campbell, H. (2003), Reclaiming Zimbabwe: The Exhaustion of the Patriarchal Model of Liberation, New Jersey: Africa World Press; South Africa: David Phillip.
Campbell, H. (1985), Rasta and Resistance: From Marcus Garvey to Walter Rodney, Hansib Publications (French translation published by Camion Blanc in 2014, foreword by Jérémie Kroubo Dagnini).
Campbell, H. (2018), "Nelson Mandela: Ubuntu and the Universalist Spirit," in Shubin, V., and Zelenova, D. (eds), South Africa: Pages of History and Contemporary Politics, Moscow: Institute of African Studies.
Campbell, H. (2018), "The Pan African Experience: From The OAU to the African Union,"  in Falola, T., and Shanguhyia, M.S., (eds): The Palgrave Handbook of African Colonial and Postcolonial History, New York: Palgrave, Macmillan. 

Articles
(2013) "The Military Defeat of the South Africans in Angola," Monthly Review, Vol. 64, No. 11 (April 2013).
(2009) "Reparations and regrets: Why is the US Senate apologising now?", Pambazuka News,  Issue 440 (2009-07-02.)
(2009) "Tajudeen Abdul-Raheem and the tasks of Pan-Africanists", Pambazuka News, Issue 442 (2009-07-16).
(2009) "Zimbabwe: Where is the Outrage? Mamdani, Mugabe and the African Scholarly Community", Association of Concerned Africa Scholars (16 March 2009).
(2009) "Obama and US Policy Towards Africa" , Pambazuka News, Issue 415 (15-01-2009).

Television appearances
 "Analyst: On Africa Visit, Bush Pushes Agenda of Continent-Wide U.S. Military Expansion", Democracy Now! (18 February 2008).
 "Zimbabwe and the Question of Imperialism: A Discussion", Democracy Now! (26 June 2008).
 "As Thousands Flee Ivory Coast, Former Clinton Adviser Lanny Davis is Paid Lobbyist for President Who Refuses to Cede Power", Democracy Now! (27 December 2010).
 "Sudan Referendum: A Real Turning Point for the People of Africa", Democracy Now! (4 January 2011).
 "Ivory Coast Showdown: A Discussion on the Political Crisis in West Africa", Democracy Now! (4 January 2011).
 "Prof. Horace Campbell: Peace & Justice Movement Should Oppose U.S.-Led Intervention in Libya", Democracy Now! (2 March 2011).
 "Horace Campbell: Obama Takes 'Imperial Tour' of Africa as World Honors Ailing Mandela", Democracy Now! (28 June 2013)
 "Horace Campbell on Mandela's Legacy, NATO's Failure in Libya and Obama's Trip to Africa", Democracy Now!'' (28 June 2013).

External links
 Faculty webpage  at the Maxwell School of Citizenship, Syracuse University
 Faculty webpage  at the Department of African American Studies, Syracuse University
 The New African Initiative: Peace, Justice and Reparations or the Rekindling of the Human Spirit (included as a document at the World Summit for Sustainable Development in Johannesburg, South Africa, 2002)

References

Jamaican academics
Alumni of the University of Sussex
Syracuse University faculty
Northwestern University faculty
Living people
Makerere University alumni
Year of birth missing (living people)
Pan-Africanism
Political scientists